Patreliura is a monotypic moth genus in the subfamily Arctiinae erected by George Hampson in 1898. Its single species, Patreliura capys, was first described by Pieter Cramer in 1775. It is found in Guyana, Suriname and Brazil (Tefé).

References

Arctiinae